Rhaw or RHAW may refer to:

 Georg Rhaw (1488–1548), German composer 
 Radar Homing and Warning (RHAW), an object-detection system